Li Xiuping (born 16 February 1963) is a former Chinese news anchor for China Central Television, the main state announcer of China.

She won the Golden Mike Award in 2009.

She is known all over China as an announcer for the 7:00 pm CCTV News program Xinwen Lianbo, which has reach all over China on various networks and internationally, is one of the most watched news programs in the world.

Biography
Li was born in February 1963 in Lanzhou, Gansu, with her father Li Linxu was a bridge engineer who worked at the First Surveying & Designing Institute of the Ministry of Railways.

she entered Communication University of China in 1983, majoring in broadcasting, where she graduated in 1987. After graduation, she joined the Gansu Television,

Li anchored the Xinwen Lianbo since October 13, 1989.

In February 2013, Li was employed as a professor at Northwest Normal University.

Works

Television
 Xinwen Lianbo

Awards
 2009 Golden Mike Award.

Personal life
Li was married to a Chinese politician Zhang Chunxian, who is a member of the Politburo of the Communist Party of China and the Party secretary of Xinjiang, the couple has a daughter.

References

1963 births
People from Lanzhou
Communication University of China alumni
Living people
CCTV newsreaders and journalists